William Edward Woolley (17 March 1901 – 11 May 1989) was a National Liberal Party politician in the United Kingdom.

He was elected in 1940 as Member of Parliament (MP) for the Spen Valley constituency in the West Riding of Yorkshire, at an unopposed by-election on 1 June. At the 1945 general election, he lost the seat to the Labour Party candidate, Granville Maynard Sharp.

References

External links 
 

1901 births
1989 deaths
National Liberal Party (UK, 1931) politicians
Members of the Parliament of the United Kingdom for English constituencies
UK MPs 1935–1945